Klaus-Peter Lesch is a German clinical psychiatrist who has been investigating the neurobiological foundation of personality traits.

His 1996 paper
on the association between the 5-HTTLPR polymorphism in the serotonin transporter gene and the personality trait neuroticism has been highly cited and was one of the first papers in personality genetics.

He is professor at the University of Würzburg.
Among his coauthors has been Peter Riederer.

Important Publications

External links 
 Klaus-Peter Lesch at Würzburg University

References 

German psychiatrists
Living people
Year of birth missing (living people)